Queen Uiin (의인왕후 박씨; 5 May 1555 – 5 August 1600), of the Bannam Park clan, was a posthumous name bestowed to the first wife and first queen consort of Yi Yeon, King Seonjo, the 14th Joseon monarch. She was queen consort of Joseon from 1569 until her death in 1600.

Life

Early life 
The future queen was born on 5 May 1555 during the reign of King Myeongjong. Her father, Park Eung-sun, was member of the Bannam Park clan. Her mother was member of the Jeonju Yi clan. She had an older brother. 

Through her mother, Lady Park is a first cousin fifth times removed of her future husband, King Seonjo. King Seonjo and Lady Park both share King Sejong as their ancestor as he’s their 5th great-grandfather. King Seonjo’s father, Internal Grand Prince Deokheung, is the 3rd great-grandson of King Sejong, and King Seonjo’s mother, Internal Grand Princess Consort Hadong, is also the 3rd great-granddaughter of King Sejong.

Through her maternal 3rd great-grandmother, she is also a 4th great-granddaughter of Han Hwak and a 3rd great-grandniece of Queen Sohye; the mother of King Seongjong and daughter of Han Hwak.

Her first cousin, Park Mi, eventually became the 5th great-grandfather of Park Myeong-won; the husband of Princess Hwapyeong who was the eldest daughter of King Yeongjo and Royal Noble Consort Yeong.

Life as queen consort 
She became queen consort at the age of 15 in 1569 when she married the 17-year-old King Seonjo. Her mother was given the royal title of "Internal Princess Consort Wansan" (완산부부인) and her father being given the title of "Internal Prince Banseong" (반성부원군).

But being unable to bear children had caused her to be alienated by her husband who went to concubines to produce heirs. She built Buddhist temples all over the country for her to pray in and made frequent donations to the temples, including Geonbongsa and Beopjusa.

Imjin War and death 
After the Imjin War, Seonjo fled to Uiju to seek protection, bringing his concubine, Royal Noble Consort In of the Suwon Kim clan (인빈 김씨) and the Queen with him. But the Queen got separated on their way to their seek shelter, and so the Queen fled to Pyeonganam Island, Pyeongan Province. The King and Kim Inbin returned to the capital, but the Queen decided to stay in Haeju until 1597.

When the Second Invasion happened, Seonjo once again fled with Kim In-Bin but this time, the Queen fled together with Crown Prince Gwanghae. Her health deteriorated because of constantly moving from one place to another, and she later died at the age of 45 without any issue. She posthumously honoured as Queen Uiin (의인왕후).

Family 
Parent

 Uncle - Park Eung-cheon (박응천, 朴應川) (? - 1581)
 Aunt - Lady Kim (김씨, 金氏)
Cousin - Park Dong-hyeon (박동현, 朴東賢)
 Aunt - Lady Park of the Bannam Park clan (반남 박씨, 潘南 朴氏)
 Uncle - Yi Hui-baek (이희백, 李希伯)
 Aunt - Lady Park of the Bannam Park clan (반남 박씨, 潘南 朴氏)
 Uncle - Park Seong-won (박성원, 朴誠元)
 Father − Park Eung-sun (박응순, 朴應順) (11 June 1526 - 10 November 1580)
 Uncle - Park Eung-nam (박응남, 朴應男) (1527 - 1572)
 Uncle - Park Eung-in (박응인, 朴應寅) (1532 - 1606)
 Uncle - Park Eung-bok (박응복, 朴應福) (1530 - 1598)
 Aunt - Lady Im of the Seonsan Im clan (증 정경부인 선산 임씨)
 Cousin - Park Dong-yeol (박동열, 朴東說) (1564 - 1622)
 Cousin - Park Dong-ryang (박동량, 朴東亮) (1569 - 1635)
 Cousin-in-law - Lady Min of the Yeoheung Min clan (정경부인 여흥 민씨, 貞敬夫人 驪興 閔氏)
 First cousin - Park Mi (박미, 朴瀰) (1592 - 1645)
 First cousin - Park Ui (박의, 朴倚)
 First cousin - Park Yu (박유, 朴濰)
 First cousin - Park Ja (박자, 朴澬)
 First cousin - Lady Park of the Bannam Park clan (정부인 반남 박씨, 貞夫人 潘南 朴氏)
 First cousin - Lady Park of the Bannam Park clan (반남 박씨, 潘南 朴氏)
 First cousin - Lady Park of the Bannam Park clan (반남 박씨, 潘南 朴氏)
 1) Grandfather − Park So (박소, 朴紹) (1493 - 1534); was prime minister
 2) Great-Grandfather − Park Jo-nyeon (박조년, 朴兆年) (1459 - 1500)
 3) Great-Great-Grandfather − Park Im-jong (박임종, 朴林宗)
 4) Great-Great-Great-Grandfather - Park Gyu (박규, 朴葵)
 5) Great-Great-Great-Great-Grandfather - Park Eun (박은, 朴誾) (1370 - 1422)
 5) Great-Great-Great-Great-Grandmother - Lady Ju (주씨, 周氏); daughter of Ju Eon-bang (주언방, 周彦邦)
 4) Great-Great-Great-Grandmother - Lady Byeon of the Wonju Byeon clan (원주 변씨); granddaughter of Byeon Hyeon-ui (변현의)
 2) Great-Grandmother − Lady Yun of the Papyeong Yun clan (정경부인 파평 윤씨, 貞敬夫人 坡平 尹氏) (? - 1520)
 1) Grandmother − Lady Hong of the Namyang Hong clan (정경부인 남양 홍씨, 貞敬夫人 南陽 洪氏) (1494 - 1578)
 2) Great-Grandfather − Hong Sa-bu (홍사부, 洪士俯)
 Mother − Yi Su, Internal Princess Consort Wansan of the Jeonju Yi clan (이수 완산부부인 전주 이씨, 李壽 完山府夫人 全州 李氏) (1528 - 1595)
 1) Grandfather − Yi Su-gab (문천수 이수갑, 文川守 李壽甲) (1495 - 1568)
 4) Great-Great-Great-Grandfather − Yi Jong, Prince Gyeyang (이증 계양군, 李璔 桂陽君) (1427 - 1464)
 1) Grandmother - Lady Kim of the Gwangju Kim clan (광주 김씨, 光州 金氏)
 4) Great-Great-Great-Grandmother − Princess Jeongseon of the Cheongju Han clan (정선군부인 청주 한씨, 旌善郡夫人 淸州韓氏) (1426 - 1480)

Sibling

 Older brother − Park Dong-eon (박동언, 朴東彦) (1553 - 1605)
 Sister-in-law − Lady Jeong of the Gwangsan Jeong clan (정부인 광산 정씨, 貞夫人 光山 鄭氏)
 Niece - Lady Park of the Bannam Park clan (반남 박씨, 潘南 朴氏)
 Nephew-in-law - Oh Ik (오익)
 Unnamed nephew

Consort

 Yi Yeon, King Seonjo (선조, 宣祖) (1552 - 1608)
 Mother-in-law - Grand Internal Princess Consort Hadong of the Hadong Jeong clan (하동부대부인 하동 정씨, 河東府大夫人 河東 鄭氏) (1522 - 1567)
 Legal mother-in-law - Queen Insun of the Cheongsong Sim clan (인순왕후 심씨) (7 June 1532 - 12 February 1575)
 Father-in-law − Grand Internal Prince Deokheung (덕흥대원군, 德興大院君) (1530 - 1559)
 Legal father-in-law - Myeongjong of Joseon (3 July 1534 – 3 August 1567) (조선명종)

Issue

 Adoptive son − King Gwanghae (광해군, 光海君) (1575 - 1641)
 Adoptive daughter-in-law − Queen Hyejang of the Munhwa Yu clan (혜장왕후 유씨) (1576 - 1623)
 Unnamed adoptive grandson; died prematurely 
 Adoptive grandson - Yi Ji, Deposed Crown Prince (이지 폐세자) (31 December 1598 – 22 July 1623) 
 Adoptive granddaughter-in-law - Deposed Crown Princess Consort Park of the Miryang Park clan (폐빈 박씨) (1598 – May 1623) 
 Adoptive great-granddaughter - Unnamed princess (군주)

In popular culture
 Portrayed by Lee Hyo-choon in the 2003-2004 SBS TV series The King's Woman.
Portrayed by Hwang Mi-seon in the 2004-2005 KBS TV series Immortal Admiral Yi Soon Shin.
Portrayed by Im Ji-eun in the 2014 KBS2 TV series The King's Face.
Portrayed by Hwang In-young in the 2015 KBS TV series Jingbirok.
 Portrayed by Kang Han-na in the 2016 JTBC TV series Mirror of the Witch.

Notes

References

16th-century Korean people
1555 births
1600 deaths
Royal consorts of the Joseon dynasty
Korean queens consort